The Battle of Salher was a battle fought between the Marathas and the Mughal Empire in February 1672 CE. The battle was fought near the fort of Salher in the Nashik district. The result was a decisive victory for the Marathas. This battle is considered particularly significant as it is the first pitched battle in which the Mughal Empire lost to the Marathas.

Background
The Treaty of Purandar (1665) required Shivaji Maharaj to cede 23 forts to the Mughals. Strategically important forts, which were fortified with garrisons, such as Sinhagad, Purandar, Lohagad, Karnala, and Mahuli were turned over to the Mughal empire. At the time of this treaty, the Nashik region, that contained the forts Salher and Mulher, was firmly in the Mughal Empire's hands since 1636. The signing of this treaty resulted in Shivaji's visit to Agra and after his famous escape from the same in September 1666, 2 years of ‘uneasy truce’ followed. 

The period between 1670-1672 saw a dramatic rise in Shivaji’s power and territory. Shivaji’s armies successfully conducted raids at Baglan, Khandesh, and Surat and retook more than a dozen forts. This culminated with a decisive victory against a Mughal army of more than 40,000 on an open field near Salher.

The Battle
Senapati Prataprao Gujar and along with his army of 15,000 captured the Mughal forts Aundha, Patta, Trimbak and attacked Salher and Mulher in January 1671. This led Aurangzeb to send two of his generals Ikhlas Khan and Bahlol Khan along with 12,000 horsemen to reclaim Salher. In October 1671, the Mughal Army laid siege on Salher. In return Shivaji commanded his two commanders Peshwa  Moropant Pingle and Sardar Prataprao Gujar reclaim the fort.

50,000 Mughals had besieged the fort for more than 6 months. Shivaji knew the strategic importance of Salher as it was the main fort on important trade routes. Dilerkhan had also attacked Pune in the meanwhile and Shivaji could not save Pune because his main armies were away. Shivaji devised a plan to divert Dilerkhan by forcing him reach Salher. He ordered Moropant who was in South Konkan and Prataprao who was raiding near Aurangabad to meet and attack Mughals at Salher to relieve the fort. In his letter to his commanders Shivaji had written 'Go to the north and attack Salher and defeat the enemy'. Both the Maratha forces met near the village of Vani, they bypassed the Mughal camp at Nashik and reached near Salher. The total Maratha strength was of 40,000(20,000 infantry + 20,000 cavalry). The terrain was not suitable for cavalry battle hence the Maratha commanders decided to lure, split and finish the Mughal forces at different places. As per the plan Prataprao Gujar stormed the Mughals with 5,000 cavalry and killed many unprepared soldiers. After half an hour the Mughals became fully ready and Prataprao started to flee with his army. The entire Mughal cavalry of 25,000 started chasing the Marathas. Prataprao lured mughal cavalry in a pass 25 km away from Salher where the 15,000 cavalry under Anandrao Makaji was hiding. Prataprao turned his back in the pass and attacked the Mughals once again. The 15,000 fresh cavalry under Anandrao blocked the other end of the pass and Mughals were surrounded from all sides. The fresh Maratha cavalry soundly defeated the tired Mughal cavalry in 2-3 hours. Thousands of Mughals fled the Battle.

Moropant later surrounded and attacked the 25,000 strong Mughal infantry at Salher with his 20,000 infantry. Prominent maratha sardar and Shivaji's childhood friend Suryaji Kakde was killed by a Zamburak cannon in the battle.

The  battle lasted for an entire day and it is estimated that around 10,000 men were killed on both the sides. The Mughal military machines (consisting of cavalry, infantry, and artillery) were outmatched by the light cavalry of the Marathas. The imperial Mughal armies were completely routed and the Marathas gave them a crushing defeat. 6,000 horses, an equal number of camels, 125 elephants, and an entire Mughal train were captured by the victorious Maratha Army. Other than this, a large amount of goods, treasures, gold, jewels, clothes, and carpets were seized by the Marathas.

The Sabhasad Bakhar describes the battle as follows "As the fighting began, such a (cloud of) dust arose that for a space of a three-kilometer square, friend and foe could not be distinguished. Elephants were killed. Ten thousand men on the two sides became corpses. The horses, camels, elephants (killed) were beyond counting. A flood of blood streamed (in the battlefield). The blood formed a muddy pool and in it (people) began to sink, so (deep) was the mud."

Outcome
The battle resulted in a decisive Maratha victory which resulted in the liberation of Salher. Further, the nearby fort of Mulher was also taken from the Mughals as a consequence of this battle. 22 wazirs of note were taken as prisoners and Ikhlas Khan and Bahlol Khan were captured. Among the Mughal soldiers who were prisoners around one or two thousand escaped. The notable Panchazari Sardar of the Maratha army Suryajirao Kakade was killed in this battle and was revered for his ferocity during the battle. Approximately a dozen Maratha sardars were gifted for their remarkable achievements in the battle and the two officers (Sardar Moropant Pingle and Sardar Prataprao Gujar) were specially rewarded.

Consequences 
Most of Shivaji's victories until this battle had been through means of guerilla warfare, but the Maratha's use of light cavalry on the Salher battlefield against the apparently superior Mughal forces proved effective. This grand victory resulted in the saint Ramdas to write his famous letter to Shivaji in which he addresses him as Gajpati (Lord of Elephants), Haypati (Lord of Cavalry), Gadpati (Lord of Forts), and Jalpati (Master of the High Seas). Although not as a direct outcome of this battle, a couple of years later in 1674, Shivaji was crowned the Chhatrapati of his realm.

See also
Imperial Maratha Conquests
History of India
Maratha Army
Maratha India
Battle of Panhala
Battle of Saraighat
Battle of Raichur

References 

Bibliography

1672 in India
Salher
History of Nashik
Salher
Salher